Thomas Small (2 September 1907–1993) was an English professional footballer who played in the Football League for Mansfield Town.

References

1907 births
1993 deaths
English footballers
Association football forwards
English Football League players
Scarborough F.C. players
Aston Villa F.C. players
Mansfield Town F.C. players